Walton is a town in Tipton Township, Cass County, Indiana, United States. The population was 1,049 at the 2010 census.

History
Walton had its start in the year 1852 by the building of the railroad through that territory. It was named for its founder Gilbert W. Wall. The Walton post office was established in 1856.

Geography
Walton is located at  (40.662327, -86.241860).

Demographics

2010 census
As of the census of 2010, there were 1,049 people, 408 households, and 284 families living in the town. The racial makeup of the town was 93.2% White, 0.3% African American, 0.1% Native American, 0.3% Asian, 4.5% from other races, and 1.6% from two or more races. Hispanic or Latino of any race were 9.5% of the population.

There were 408 households, of which 38.2% had children under the age of 18 living with them, 51.0% were married couples living together, 12.5% had a female householder with no husband present, 6.1% had a male householder with no wife present, and 30.4% were non-families. 27.5% of all households were made up of individuals, and 13.9% had someone living alone who was 65 years of age or older. The average household size was 2.57 and the average family size was 3.11.

The median age in the town was 36.4 years. 27.5% of residents were under the age of 18; 8.7% were between the ages of 18 and 24; 25.2% were from 25 to 44; 23.6% were from 45 to 64; and 15% were 65 years of age or older. The gender makeup of the town was 46.6% male and 53.4% female.

2000 census
As of the census of 2000, there were 1,069 people, 413 households, and 301 families living in the town. The racial makeup of the town was 92.42% White, 0.19% African American, 0.75% Native American, 0.09% Asian, 5.89% from other races, and 0.65% from two or more races. Hispanic or Latino of any race were 10.66% of the population.

There were 413 households, out of which 34.6% had children under the age of 18 living with them, 57.9% were married couples living together, 11.6% had a female householder with no husband present, and 26.9% were non-families. 24.5% of all households were made up of individuals, and 11.1% had someone living alone who was 65 years of age or older. The average household size was 2.59 and the average family size was 3.08.

In the town, the population was spread out, with 28.2% under the age of 18, 7.8% from 18 to 24, 28.3% from 25 to 44, 22.9% from 45 to 64, and 12.9% who were 65 years of age or older. The median age was 36 years. For every 100 females, there were 89.9 males. For every 100 females age 18 and over, there were 82.0 males.

The median income for a household in the town was $41,429, and the median income for a family was $49,167. Males had a median income of $30,750 versus $23,846 for females. The per capita income for the town was $19,087. About 2.9% of families and 6.0% of the population were below the poverty line, including 5.8% of those under age 18 and 5.4% of those age 65 or over.

Education 

Lewis Cass High School is located near Walton, and is a part of the Southeastern School Corporation.

Lewis Cass High School competes in the Hoosier Athletic Conference for all athletics. It left the Mid-Indiana Conference in the 2015–2016 school year to join the Hoosier Conference when the Mid-Indiana Conference dissolved.

References

Towns in Cass County, Indiana
Towns in Indiana
Populated places established in 1852
1852 establishments in Indiana